The Police (Scotland) Act 1966 was an Act of the Parliament of the United Kingdom.

The whole Act was repealed by the Police (Scotland) Act 1967.

1966 in Scotland
United Kingdom Acts of Parliament 1966
Acts of the Parliament of the United Kingdom concerning Scotland
Repealed United Kingdom Acts of Parliament
Police legislation in the United Kingdom